"When the Party's Over" (stylized in all lowercase) is a song by American singer-songwriter Billie Eilish and the second single from her debut studio album, When We All Fall Asleep, Where Do We Go? (2019). It was released on October 16, 2018, through Darkroom and Interscope Records. It was written and produced by Finneas O'Connell.

Background and recording 
The concept behind "When the Party's Over" was inspired after Finneas O'Connell, Eilish's brother, had left his date's house "kind of for no reason" and was driving home alone late at night, simultaneously unhappy at the end of the relationship but also feeling a sense of safety through a lack of full investment in it. O'Connell later approached Eilish with a draft of the track, and they decided to perform it live "a full year before it came out," which O'Connell later recalled was "such a terrible idea" as he feared that fans would deem the studio recording inferior to the live version. They consequently set out to "get the magic" of a live performance "into a space where it's still interesting to record," a process which O'Connell described as "really hard" due to the song's delicate nature.

Eilish and O'Connell decided that the track would be "almost entirely" vocal, utilising only sub-bass and acoustic piano as additional instruments; this made it "super challenging" to keep each measure interesting. The song required approximately 100 vocal tracks, which included the stacking of layers on each part of the harmony as well as "weird processed adlibs," while Eilish recorded over 90 takes of the song's first word "don't" to obtain the right sound. The influence of choral music on the song was informed by the siblings' experience singing in a choir during their childhood, and Eilish disclosed that it was also inspired by the songs "Stand Still" (2017) by Sabrina Claudio, "715 - CRΣΣKS" (2016) by Bon Iver and "Hide and Seek" (2005) by Imogen Heap.

Composition and lyrics 

"When the Party's Over" is a bare-bones piano ballad that acts as a departure from the electro and R&B beats of her earlier output. Music publications have noted its hymnal-like qualities and use of bass, as well as its minimal instrumentation, which spotlight Eilish's vocal abilities. Rolling Stone editor Ryan Reed highlighted the tracks's "atmospheric vocal harmonies," use of vocoder and Eilish's use of her high vocal register, while Nicole Engelman of Billboard wrote of the "angelic hums" that accompany the singer, whose voice "[swells] up from a whisper." Chris DeVille of Stereogum compared the song to the work of Imogen Heap and Lana Del Rey. According to sheet music published at Musicnotes.com by Sony/ATV Music Publishing, the song is set in a  time signature with a tempo of 124 beats per minute. It is composed in the key of C# minor, with Eilish's vocal range between the notes of E3 and E5.

Eilish has described the song as "kind of a sequel" to her single "Party Favor" (2018), documenting when "you're on the phone with someone and you can't hear them, they can't hear you, it's loud, they're mad at you for some reason" and consequently thinking: "You know what? Fucking leave me alone." It discusses the end of a relationship, a common subject matter in the Eilish's previous work, with the singer wishing to be "more than a party of one;" Suzy Exposito of Rolling Stone described it as one of the more sincere songs off her debut album When We All Fall Asleep, Where Do We Go? (2019), while Reed wrote that "each verse [grows] more mournful" as the song progresses It opens with a sample of Eilish's debut single "Ocean Eyes" (2016), which Sean Ward of The Line of Best Fit argued demonstrated an "understanding of her own artistry." No instruments accompany the vocals until the first chorus a minute into the track, where a sub-bass is introduced.

Critical reception
"When the Party's Over" was met with critical acclaim. Suzy Exposito of Rolling Stone wrote that the track is one of the moments off When We All Fall Asleep where "Eilish can't help but draw back the curtain [...] and let you in." Similarly, Sputnikmusic reviewer SowingSeason called it one of the "still frame moments when she allows herself to be heard not as the cynical teenage pop star, but rather as Billie the seventeen year old girl who's going through all the same things you are;" they also commended her "mesmerizing whispers and hums." Billboards Nicole Engelman praised the "haunting" song's "sharply insightful" lyrics, which she argued "demonstrate a maturity well beyond her 16 years of age." Pitchfork editor Stacey Anderson commended the singer's vocal performance, while Grant Rindner of Uproxx considered that the single proved "that she has one of the most arresting voices in pop." Tanis Smither of Earmilk praised the song as "heart-wrenching," writing that it "somehow manages to maintain her brand of ballsy production and delicate, dreamy vocal." The Austin Chronicles Alejandra Ramirez wrote that the song was one of the moments where Eilish "flips the LP's most archetypal pop moments on their head." Christopher Thiessen listed it as one of the album's standout tracks in his review for Consequence of Sound. Insider placed it at number 4 on their list of Eilish's best songs on March 18, 2020, with Callie Ahlgrim describing it as "perfect blend of Eilish's fluttery, melancholic vocals and O'Connell's empathetic songwriting abilities."

Music video
The music video was released on October 25, 2018. The video starts with a blue-haired Eilish sitting in a white room, before gulping down a cup filled with black liquid. Black tears start flowing down her cheeks, staining her outfit in the process. Towards the end of the video, the camera pans downwards, revealing that the black liquid started to stain the floor. Many have recognized the similarity between the black tears of the music video and the alternative cover of Lady Gaga's EP The Fame Monster, but Eilish claims that her inspiration for the video came from a fan art of a drawing of her with black eyes leaking. "I thought it was visually really dope and I wanted to physically create it." It was directed by Carlos López Estrada. The music video was created without special effects as Eilish had tubes tabed into the corner of her eyes where the black liquid would flow out of, giving the illusion of black tears. She later interacts with the tears, wiping them across her face and they drip down. Eilish said she wanted to "physically create" this drawing she was given and this is how she did it. The music video was uploaded to Eilish's YouTube channel through Vevo, and has gained more than 854 million views as of March 2023.

Covers
English band Bring Me the Horizon covered the song during a performance on BBC Radio 1. Scottish singer-songwriter Lewis Capaldi recorded a cover for his Spotify Singles EP. English singer-songwriter James Blake's cover was included in his EP, Covers.

Credits and personnel 
Credits adapted from Tidal.

 Billie Eilish – Lead vocals, backing vocals 
 Finneas O'Connell – producer, songwriter, backing vocals, bass, percussion, piano
 John Greenham – mastering engineer, studio personnel
 Rob Kinelski – mixer, studio personnel
 Casey Cuayo – assistant mixer, studio personnel

Awards and nominations

Charts

Weekly charts

Year-end charts

Certifications

Release history

Notes

References

External links 
 
 

Songs about parties
2010s ballads
2018 singles
2018 songs
Interscope Records singles
Songs written by Finneas O'Connell
Pop ballads
Billie Eilish songs
Song recordings produced by Finneas O'Connell